Fofantsevo is a rural locality (a village) in Prilukskoye Rural Settlement, Vologodsky District, Vologda Oblast, Russia. The population was 793 as of 2002.

Geography 
Fofantsevo is located 15 km northeast of Vologda (the district's administrative centre) by road. Muravyovo is the nearest rural locality.

References 

Rural localities in Vologodsky District